Peter Robert Thackeray (born 26 September 1950) is a Kenyan born former English cricketer.  Thackeray was a right-handed batsman who bowled right-arm medium pace.  He was born in Nairobi, Kenya.

Thackeray played three times for Devon in the 1972 Minor Counties Championship against Cornwall, the Somerset Second XI and Oxfordshire.  He made his first-class debut for Oxford University against Leicestershire in 1974.  He made seven further first-class appearances for the University in 1974, playing his final first-class match in the 1974 University Match against Cambridge University at Lord's.  In his eight first-class matches, Thackeray scored 315 runs at a batting average of 28.63, with two half centuries and a high score of 65* against Worcestershire.

References

External links
Peter Thackeray at ESPNcricinfo
Peter Thackeray at CricketArchive

1950 births
Living people
Cricketers from Nairobi
English people of Kenyan descent
English cricketers
Devon cricketers
Oxford University cricketers
Alumni of Keble College, Oxford